The Anniversaries are a series of short compositions of easy difficulty for solo piano by American composer Leonard Bernstein. These compositions were written over the course of forty years as gifts for people Bernstein was acquainted or friends with on the occasion of their birthday. The published series comprises the following works:

Bernstein composed many more anniversaries that eventually fell out of interest and were abandoned and never re-used in other compositions. Examples of anniversaries that were used in other compositions include No. 1 in Four Sabras, which was never included in the anniversaries series.

Anniversaries for Orchestra 

In 2016, long-time Bernstein championeer Garth Edwin Sunderland wrote a suite entitled Anniversaries for Orchestra. The collection of eleven anniversaries was taken from the four different sets and was arranged for a large orchestra. The piece had a total duration of 15 minutes and was scored for two flutes (with two piccolos), two oboes (second oboe doubling English horn), two clarinets in B-flat (first clarinet doubling clarinet in E-flat, second clarinet doubling bass clarinet), two bassoons (second bassoon doubling contrabassoon), two horns in F, two trumpets in C, two trombones (second trombone doubling bass trombone), timpani, two percussionists (playing a glockenspiel, a xylophone, a vibraphone, chimes, a triangle, suspended cymbals, a tam-tam, a tambourine, a snare drum, a field drum, and a bass drum), and a regular-sized string section. It was first recorded under Naxos with Marin Alsop and the São Paulo State Symphony Orchestra.

References

See also 

 List of compositions by Leonard Bernstein

Compositions by Leonard Bernstein
Compositions for solo piano
Piano compositions by American composers